is a district located in Tokachi Subprefecture, Hokkaido, Japan.

As of 2004, the district has an estimated population of 11,424 and a density of 5.66 persons per km2. The total area is 2,016.90 km2.

Towns
Ashoro
Rikubetsu

History
1869 Provinces and districts established in Hokkaido, Ashoro District created in Kushiro Province
October 20, 1948 Ashoro District split off from Kushirokuni Subprefecture (now Kushiro Subprefecture) and incorporated into Tokachi Subprefecture
April 1, 1951 Part of Nishiashoro town, Nakagawa District incorporated into Rikubetsu town
April 1, 1955 Nishiashoro town, (from Nakagawa District) merged with Ashoro village to elevate Ashoro town, (from Ashoro District)

Districts in Hokkaido